The Northern Beaches Hospital is a hospital in Frenchs Forest, located in the Northern Beaches region of Sydney, New South Wales, Australia.

History
In May 2013 the State Government announced the Northern Beaches Hospital would be built in Frenchs Forest. Upon its completion it became the primary hospital for the Northern Beaches, with Manly Hospital to close and Mona Vale Hospital to be downgraded. It is operated by Healthscope. In December 2014, Leighton Contractors were selected to build the hospital. The hospital opened on 30 October 2018.

As part of the project, a series of road enhancements were made to the adjoining Forest Way, Wakehurst Parkway and Warringah Road by a Ferrovial/York Civil joint venture. Upgrades were completed in mid-2020.

The hospital is both a private and public hospital, and it is expected that 40% of beds will be reserved for private patients. 

Northern Beaches Hospital played an integral role in the COVID-19 response in NSW by operating a 7-day/week COVID-19 testing clinic, busy emergency department, and admitted unwell patients into the intensive care unit. In early 2022 over 60 ward beds were dedicated to COVID-19 patients. The hospital was one of the first in Sydney to allow visitors to once again visit patients.

References

Hospital buildings completed in 2018
Hospitals established in 2018
Hospitals in Sydney
2018 establishments in Australia